Matthew Horise Trannon (born July 7, 1983) is a former American football wide receiver. He was signed by the Arizona Cardinals as an undrafted free agent in 2007. He played college football as well as basketball at Michigan State.

Trannon has also been a member of the Kansas City Chiefs, Oakland Raiders and Pittsburgh Steelers.

Early years
He was ranked among the nation's top 20 prep basketball players by ESPN.com (No. 18), and was the number six ranked power forward, and ranked as the nation's 34th best wide receivers by Rivals.com. He was named the top high school athlete in the nation by Prep Spotlight after starring in both football and basketball at Flint Northern High School. In basketball, he averaged 19 points and 11 rebounds, in football he caught 30 passes for 700 yards and 7 touchdowns as a senior.

College career

Basketball
Trannon did not join the basketball team until he was a sophomore where he played in 17 games, averaging 6.9 minutes per contest averaged 1.2 points and 1.6 rebounds per contest. During his junior year, he shot 68.8 percent (22-of-32) from the field, tops among teammates with at least 30 field-goal attempts. He has played in 2 NCAA Tournaments, including an appearance in the Final Four during 2004-2005. Trannon decided to forgo his senior year of basketball to prepare for the 2007 NFL Draft.

Football
Trannon started 11 games at wide receiver, ranked second on the team with 36 receptions for 405 yards and two touchdowns in his junior year. He caught 28 passes for 259 yards in 2003 caught passes in nine different games.  During his senior year, he set the Michigan State single game reception record with 14 receptions against Eastern Michigan University, and also became MSU's all time receptions leader with 148 receptions.  In addition, he was second on the team in receptions (44), receiving yards (502) and touchdown catches (3).

Professional career

Football

Arizona Cardinals
Despite not being taken in the 2007 NFL Draft, Trannon signed with the Arizona Cardinals. He was released on August 31, 2007 but was signed to the Cardinals practice squad.

Pittsburgh Steelers
On January 18, 2008, he signed with the Pittsburgh Steelers. However, he was waived on July 24.

Basketball

Bendigo Telstra Braves
Trannon signed as an 'import player' with the Bendigo Braves basketball team, based in Bendigo, Australia in 2009.

Personal
He is the son of Katherine & Matthew Trannon(deceased) and cousin of former NFL player Lonnie Young.

References

External links
Michigan State Spartans football bio
Michigan State Spartans men's basketball bio
Pittsburgh Steelers bio

1983 births
Living people
American expatriate basketball people in Australia
American football wide receivers
American men's basketball players
Basketball players from Flint, Michigan
Michigan State Spartans men's basketball players
Michigan State Spartans football players
Players of American football from Flint, Michigan
Power forwards (basketball)